The 480s decade ran from January 1, 480, to December 31, 489.

Significant people
Dongseong, King of Baekje (479–501)
Gundobad, King of Burgundy (473–516)
Zeno, Emperor of the Byzantine Empire (476–491)
Acacius of Constantinople, Patriarch of Constantinople (471-488)
Fravitta of Constantinople, Patriarch of Constantinople (488-489)
Euphemius, Patriarch of Constantinople 489–495
Emperor Xiaowen, Emperor of Northern Wei (471–499)
Emperor Gao of Southern Qi, Emperor of Qi (479–482)
Emperor Wu, Emperor of Qi (482–493)
Loarn, King of Dál Riata (474–500)
Erbin of Dumnonia, King of Dumnonia (443-480)
Gerren Llyngesic ab Erbin, King of Dumnonia (c. 480–514)
Jangsu, King of Goguryeo (413–490)
Buddha Gupta, Gupta Emperor (477–496)
Einion Yrth ap Cunedda, King of Gwynedd (c. 470–500)
Khingila I, Tegin of Hephthalite Empire (AKA White Huns) (c. 440-490)
Ernakh, Ruler of the Huns (469–503)
Vakhtang I, King of Iberia (447–522)
Lughaid mac Loeguire, High King of Ireland (479–503)
Odoacer, King of Italy (476–493)
Pope Simplicius, Pope of the Roman Catholic Church, p. 468–483
Felix II (excluding Antipope Felix II), Pope of the Roman Catholic Church, p. 483–492
Emperor Seinei, Emperor of Japan (c. 480-c. 484)
Emperor Kenzō, Emperor of Japan (c. 485-c. 487)
Emperor Ninken, Emperor of Japan (c. 488-c. 498)
Hengist and Horsa, Co-Kings of Kent (455-488)
Oisc, King of Kent (488-512)
"Casper", Ajaw of Palenque (435–487)
B'utz Aj Sak Chiik, Ajaw of Palenque (487–501)
Skanda Varman IV, King of Pallava (460–480)
Nandi Varman I, King of Pallava (480–500)
Peroz I, Sassanid King (459–484)
Balash, Sassanid King (484–488)
Kavadh I, Sassanid dynasty King of Persia (488–496, 498–531)
Rhyddfedd Frych, King of Powys (c. 480–500)
Yujiulü Yucheng, Khan of the Rouran Khaganate (450-485)
Yujiulü Doulun, Khan of the Rouran Khaganate (485-492)
Childeric I, King of Salian Franks (457–481)
Clovis I, King of Salian Franks (481–509)
Soji, King of Silla (479–500)
Aelle, King of the South Saxons (c. 477–c. 514) and first Bretwalda of the Anglo-Saxon Heptarchy (488-514)
Huneric, King of the Vandals and Alans (477–484)
Gunthamund, King of the Vandals and Alans (484–496)
Euric, King of the Visigothic Kingdom (466–484)
Alaric II, King of the Visigothic Kingdom (484–507)

References